La Stampa (meaning The Press in English) is an Italian daily newspaper published in Turin, Italy. It is distributed in Italy and other European nations. It is one of the oldest newspapers in Italy.

History and profile
The paper was founded by Vittorio Bersezio, a journalist and novelist, in February 1867 with the name Gazzetta Piemontese. In 1895, the newspaper was bought (and by then edited) by Alfredo Frassati (father of Pier Giorgio Frassati), who gave it its current name and a national perspective. For criticising the 1924 murder of the socialist Giacomo Matteotti, he was forced to resign and sell the newspaper to Giovanni Agnelli. 
The financier Riccardo Gualino also took a share.
The paper is now owned by GEDI Gruppo Editoriale, and has a centrist stance. The former contributors of La Stampa include Italian novelist Alberto Moravia.

La Stampa, based in Turin, was published in broadsheet format until November 2006 when the paper began to be published in the berliner format. It launched a website in 1999. La Stampa also launched a project, called Vatican Insider, run by the daily newspaper and has among its staff several Vatican affairs analysts.

Since 26 May 2006, it has published a monthly magazine: Specchio+. From 26 January 1996 to 7 April 2006, it was called Specchio, which was published as a weekly supplement, a general interest magazine.

In September 2012 La Stampa moved to its new headquarters in Turin, leaving its historical editorial building. Mario Calabresi is the editor-in-chief of the daily.

On 9 April 2013, an explosive device was sent by an anarchist group, the Federazione Anarchica Informale/Fronte Rivoluzionario, to the offices of La Stampa. It did not detonate.

In June 2017, during the celebration for its 150 years of activity, La Stampa hosted the international conference "The Future of Newspaper", where many great actors of the news industry discussed about the future prospects for the news agencies. Among them John Elkann, editor of La Stampa, Jeff Bezos from The Washington Post, Louis Dreyfus CEO of Le Monde and Mark Thompson CEO of The New York Times.

In April 2020, Maurizio Molinari was appointed as new editor of la Repubblica and was replaced by Massimo Giannini (former journalist of la Repubblica and Radio Capital). Under his guide, La Stampa moved to a mild centre-left position.

Circulation
The 1988 circulation of La Stampa was 560,000 copies. In 1997 the paper had a circulation of 376,493 copies.

Its circulation was 399,000 copies in 2000 and 409,000 copies in 2001. The circulation of the paper was 330,000 copies in 2003 and 345,060 copies in 2004. Its 2007 circulation was 314,000 copies. It was 256,203 copies in 2012.

Contributors
Editors
Massimo Giannini (Editor)
Massimo Gramellini (Vice-Editor)
Roberto Bellato (Vice-Editor)
Umberto La Rocca (Vice-Editor)
Federico Geremicca (Vice-Editor, Rome)

Columnists and journalists
Massimo Gramellini (Columnist)
Barbara Spinelli (Columnist)
Mario Deaglio (Columnist)
Lucia Annunziata (Columnist)
Guido Ceronetti (Columnist)
Mina (Columnist)
Maurizio Molinari (Journalist)
Stefania Miretti (Columnist)
Roberto Beccantini (Columnist)
Altiero Scicchitano (Columnist)
Fiamma Nirenstein (Columnist)

Former journalists
Giovanni Arpino
Adolfo Battaglia
Enzo Bettiza
Norberto Bobbio
Antonio Carluccio
Carlo Fruttero
Franco Lucentini
Lorenzo Soria

See also

 Mass media in Italy

References

Further reading
 Merrill, John C. and Harold A. Fisher. The world's great dailies: profiles of fifty newspapers (1980) pp 280–85

External links

 
 Radio Nostalgia, the La Stampa-owned local radio station. 
 Historical archives of La Stampa 
 La Stampa Sportiva archive

1867 establishments in Italy
Fiat
Italian-language newspapers
Liberal media
Newspapers published in Turin
Newspapers established in 1867
Daily newspapers published in Italy
Italian news websites